Paris–Rouen may refer to:

 Paris–Rouen (cycle race), completed for the first time in 1869.
 Paris–Rouen (motor race), completed in 1894.
 Open May 3, 1843, is the first part of the railway line Paris-Le Havre.